The Ginseng King, also known as Three-Head Monster (Sān tóu mówáng), is a 1988 Taiwanese fantasy film that some have suggested is an unofficial remake of The NeverEnding Story.

Plot
A young boy embarks on a mission to save his mother after she is bitten by a Nazi zombie. He must save the Ginseng King from a three-headed king.

Cast
Cynthia Khan as The Ginseng Hunter

Release
Daiei Video released the film on VHS in Japan.

Reception
The film has a rating of 7.2% on IMDb.

See also
 List of zombie Nazi films
 List of Taiwanese films of the 1980s

References

External links

1988 films
Nazi zombie films
Taiwanese horror films
1988 horror films
1980s Mandarin-language films